Lui Kit Ming (born 14 June 2000) is a former Hong Kong professional footballer who played as a midfielder.

References

External links

Lui Kit Ming at HKFA

2000 births
Living people
Hong Kong footballers
Association football midfielders
TSW Pegasus FC players
Hong Kong Premier League players